The Dexter Riley film series consists of American science fiction-comedy films, centered around a college student named Dexter Riley, portrayed by Kurt Russell. The films, produced by The Walt Disney Company and taking place at the fictional Medfield College, follow the science class led by Professor Quigley, and their experiments, projects, and adventures. The college, under the direction of Dean Eugene Higgins (Joe Flynn) becomes involved in the nefarious plans of billionaire-turned-criminal, A. J. Arno (Cesar Romero).

The film trilogy received mixed reviews, while its television film remake was poorly received. The original trilogy has acquired a cult classic status. In 1999 the Dexter Riley trilogy, along with a number of other Disney film series, were expanded as a franchise into the Walt Disney Parks attraction with elements included from each movie.

Films

The Computer Wore Tennis Shoes (1969)

At Medfield College, a non-intellectual named Dexter Riley becomes brilliant overnight. Following an electrical accident that transfers a donated computer memory into his brain, he gains the ability to learn any knowledge instantly and perfectly. After Riley gains fame and attention via television appearances, the dean of a competing university decides to ruin his reputation. At the same time, A. J. Arno, a secret technological crime boss with an upstanding public persona, pursues the student and his school because the computer he donated-that is now integrated into Riley's DNA-holds the records of his nefarious acts.

Now You See Him, Now You Don't (1972)

Dexter Riley is a science student at Medfield College who accidentally invents a liquid capable of rendering objects and people invisible. As Dexter and his friends Debbie and Richard begin exploring their recent discovery, the product gains the unwanted attention of corrupt businessman A. J. Arno. Recently released from prison, Arno seeks the formula for criminal means before the students can even announce their discovery. Arno and his henchman plan to use the invisibility spray to rob a bank.

The Strongest Man in the World (1975)

Dexter Riley, who is studying science at Medfield College, decides to create a formula that will make humans stronger. After several unsuccessful attempts, a lab mishap combines his formula with a vitamin-rich breakfast cereal. He and his classmates discover that eating it briefly provides superhuman levels of strength and endurance. The greedy college dean attempts to take advantage of the discovery, marketing the product to a cereal corporation. Competing cereal companies hire thugs, including A. J. Arno, to eliminate the new miracle product.

Television

During the late 1980s and early 1990s, a number of made-for-television remake films of classic Walt Disney Productions were produced and released as a part of The Magical World of Disney series. Among them was The Computer Wore Tennis Shoes.

After a laboratory accident, the contents of a computer's encyclopedia is transferred biochemically into the brain of Dexter Riley, a less-than-average college student. After his newly acquired genius he appears on a trivia show, competing between various universities. After acing the show's quiz, and acquiring all the points, another university finds out about how he attained his skills and does everything to discredit Dexter.

Related films

The Dexter Riley film series takes place at Medfield College. The college is used as a primary location in two other Disney film franchises: The Shaggy Dog and the Flubber film series. Collectively, the three separate film series take place within the same fictional universe. Additionally, the Merlin Jones film series take place at the in-universe sister-school, Midvale College; meanwhile, The World's Greatest Athlete is set at the related academic school of Merrivale College.

Principal cast and characters

Additional crew and production details

Reception

Box office and financial performance

Critical response

Theme park attraction

In 1999, the theme of Journey into Imagination was changed and re-titled to include Figment. The ride features Dr. Nigel Channing, from Honey, I Shrunk the Audience!, who "hosts" an area known as the Imagination Institute. The story states that Channing's grandfather established the institute, while the area features references to Dean Higgins from the Dexter Riley films, as well as Wayne Szalinski from the Honey, I Shrunk the Kids franchise, as well as Dr. Philip Brainard from Flubber. Walt Disney and Thomas Edison also make an appearance.

Notes

References 

American film series
Disney film series